Sveriges Radio's Christmas Calendar is an annual series of pre-Christmas children's programmes produced and broadcast by Sveriges Radio in the form of a radio advent calendar. The first series – entitled Barnens adventskalender – was broadcast in 1957.

From 1960 until 1972, the same Christmas calendar was produced in a radio version for Sveriges Radio and a television version for Sveriges Television. Since 1973, there have been separate Christmas calendar programmes on radio and TV.

List 
 1957 – Barnens adventskalender
 1958 – Julbestyr på en bondgård
 1959 – I trollskogen
 1960 – Titteliture
 1961 – Julbåtens resa runt jorden
 1962 – Tomtefamiljen i Storskogen
 1963 – Den tänkande brevbäraren
 1964 – En gård nära Tomteskogen i Vilhelmina
 1965 – Farbror Pekkas handelsbod
 1966 – En jul för 50 år sedan
 1967 – Gumman som blev liten som en tesked
 1968 – Klart spår till Tomteboda
 1969 – Herkules Jonssons storverk
 1970 – Regnbågslandet
 1971 – Broster, Broster!
 1972 – När sagan blommade
 1973 – Tjong i baljan!
 1974 – Frida och farfar
 1975 – Albert och Evelina
 1976 – Gumman som blev liten som en tesked (rerun)
 1977 – Tomtar på loftet
 1978 – Sagor från Blåbärsberget
 1979 – Gammelfarmors chiffonjé
 1980 – Liv i luckan
 1981 – Jakten på julen
 1982 – Ett skepp kommer lastat
 1983 – Pricken Jansson knackar på
 1984 – Kulänglarna
 1985 – Skäggstölden på Kråkebohöjden
 1986 – Bland tomtar och troll
 1987 – Skor-Sten i den tidlösa tiden
 1988 – Trollet med den gula kepsen
 1989 – Beatrice
 1990 – Kråkan och Mamma Mu
 1991 – Bäjkån och Bällman
 1992 – Joels jul
 1993 – Grod jul på Näsbrännan
 1994 – Hertig Hans slott
 1995 – Hotell Pepparkaka
 1996 – Bråkar och Johanna
 1997 – Gumman som blev liten som en tesked (rerun)
 1998 – Familjen Anderssons sjuka jul
 1999 – Det snöar i Indianien
 2000 – Snälla Py
 2001 – Allans och Martins julradioshow
 2002 – Whitney och Elton Johansson
 2003 – Samma gamla visa
 2004 – Hjärtats hjältar
 2005 – Den mytiska medaljongen
 2006 – Toivos kosmos
 2007 – Gumman som blev liten som en tesked (rerun)
 2008 – Klappkampen
 2009 – Nelly Rapp –En gastkramande jul
 2010 – De vilda helgonen
 2011 – Allt du önskar
 2012 – Siri och ishavspiraterna
 2013 – Alla barnen firar jul
 2014 – High Tower
 2015 – Månsaråttan
 2016 – Lyckoborgen
 2017 – Marvinter
 2018 – Tonje i Glimmerdalen
 2019 – Biggest Bang
 2020 - Knäckarbankettten
 2021 - Spero

See also 
 Jullovsmorgon
 Sommarlovsmorgon
 Sveriges Television's Christmas calendar

References

External links 
 

 
1957 radio programme debuts